The driver monitoring system, also known as driver attention monitor, is a vehicle safety system to assess the driver's alertness and warn the driver if needed and eventually apply the brakes. It was first introduced by Toyota in 2006 for its and Lexus' latest models. It was first offered in Japan on the GS 450h. The system's functions co-operate with the pre-collision system (PCS). The system uses infrared sensors to monitor driver attentiveness. Specifically, the driver monitoring system includes a CCD camera placed on the steering column which tracks the face, via infrared LED detectors. If the driver is not paying attention to the road ahead and a dangerous situation is detected, the system will warn the driver by flashing lights, warning sounds. If no action is taken, the vehicle will apply the brakes (a warning alarm will sound followed by a brief automatic application of the braking system). This system is said to be the first of its kind.

In 2008, the Toyota Crown system went further and can detect if the driver is becoming sleepy by monitoring the eyelids.

In 2017, Cadillac released their Super Cruise system. Which allowed hands free driving at highway speeds on specially mapped highways. In order to ensure that the driver continued to pay attention to the road, they included Seeing Machines DMS, this was initially only available in the CT6.

In 2019, BMW introduced an Extended Traffic Jam Assistant System in almost its entire range of car models. This allows driving at up to 37 mph.

Vehicles

Lexus models that have adopted the Driver Monitoring System to date, listed by model year::
2006-2011 Lexus GS 450h (not available as configured in the US market)
2010-2017 Lexus LS 460
2008-2017 Lexus LS 600h
2010 Lexus HS 250h
2010-2019 Lexus GX 460

Toyota models that have adopted the Driver Monitoring System:
2008 Toyota Crown Hybrid (includes drowsiness detection)

General Motors first demonstrated their Super Cruise hands free driving using Seeing Machines Driver Monitoring System in the Cadillac CT6, soon to be rolled out across 22 models.

 2017 Cadillac CT6
 2021 Cadillac Escalade

BMW models have adopted driver monitoring system in 2019 in the optional "BMW Live Cockpit Professional" available in:

 BMW 1 Series (F40)
 BMW 2 Series (F44)
 BMW 3 Series (G20)
 BMW 5 Series (G30)
 BMW 6 Series (G32)
 BMW 7 Series (G11)
 BMW 8 Series (G15)
 BMW X3 (G01)
 BMW X4 (G02)
 BMW X5 (G05)
 BMW X6 (G06)
 BMW X7 (G07)
 BMW Z4 (G29)
 BMW iX3

The infrared cameras are in the top middle part of the instrument cluster, part of iDrive BMW Live Cockpit and driven by BMW Operating System 7.0.

Ford use the Seeing Machines DMS with infrared LEDs in a module located on the steering column behind the steering wheel as part of their active drive assist hands free driving "BlueCruise" in the 2021 Ford Mustang Mach-E and the 2021 F-150.
 Ford Mustang Mach-E
 Ford F-Series

Mercedes-Benz have integrated the camera from their Seeing Machines driver monitoring system with the 3D instrument display, head-up display, lighting and car controls in the 2021 Mercedes-Benz S-Class (W223) model.

Regulation

In European Union, regulation (EU) 2019/2144 regulates the driver monitoring system.

See also
 Driver drowsiness detection

References

External links
  Driver Monitoring System at Lexus.eu
DADS: Driver Alertness Detection System
Seeing Machines
Smart Eye 
Jungo

Lexus
Toyota
Automotive technology tradenames
Vehicle safety technologies